RYM may refer to:

 Rate Your Music, a music-based website
 Revolutionary Youth Movement, a 20th-century American political movement
 Reformed Youth Movement, a Christian-reformed camp in Florida and Colorado
 Rym Airlines, former Algerian airline (2003–2005)
 Princess Rym al-Ali (born 1969), Algerian princess